Scalthwaiterigg is a former civil parish, now in the parish of Skelsmergh and Scalthwaiterigg, in South Lakeland, Cumbria, England, immediately north east of Kendal. It previously had a joint parish council with the adjacent parish of Skelsmergh. In 2001 it had a population of 104.

There were three listed buildings or structures in the parish: the 16th-century farmhouse Benson Hall and two bridges.

History 
The parish was formed on 1 April 1897 from part of Scalthwaiterigg Hay and Hutton in the Hay. On 1 April 2015 and merged with "Skelsmergh" to form "Skelsmergh and Scalthwaiterigg".

References

Further reading

External links
 Cumbria County History Trust: Scalthwaiterigg (nb: provisional research only – see Talk page)

Former civil parishes in Cumbria
South Lakeland District